Peter-Uwe Schreiber (born 9 August 1964) is a retired West German javelin thrower.

He competed at the European Athletics Championships in 1986 and 1990 without reaching the final. He represented the sports club LG Bayer Leverkusen, and won silver medals at the West German championships in 1988 and 1990.

His personal best throw was 83.28 metres, achieved in July 1990 in Bochum.

International competitions

References

External links

1964 births
Living people
West German male javelin throwers